RML may refer to:

RML Group, a motorsports and high performance engineering company
RML 380Z, an 8-bit computer built in Britain
Ratmalana Airport (IATA: RML), near Colombo, Sri Lanka
Reuters Market Light, a phone service to provide Indian farmers with timely information
Revised Marriage Law, a 1980 revision of the New Marriage Law in China
Riemann Musiklexikon, a music encyclopedia
Rifled muzzle loader, a type of gun common in the 19th century
AEC Routemaster, a type of double-decker bus
Rocket Madsen Space Lab (RML Spacelab), Copenhagen, Denmark
Rocky Mountain Laboratories, a research institute in Montana, United States
Roddenbery Memorial Library, in Cairo, Georgia, United States
Royal Mail Lines, once a major shipping company, the successor to the Royal Mail Steam Packet Company

See also